Slovenia competed at the 2022 Mediterranean Games held in Oran, Algeria from 25 June to 6 July 2022.

Medalists

| width="78%" align="left" valign="top" |

Archery

Slovenia competed in archery.

Artistic gymnastics

Slovenia competed in artistic gymnastics.

Athletics

Slovenia won three medals in athletics.

Badminton

Slovenia competed in badminton.

Boules

Slovenia competed in boules.

Boxing

Slovenia competed in boxing.

Cycling

Slovenia competed in cycling.

Judo

Slovenia competed in judo.

Karate

Slovenia competed in karate.

Men

Women

Shooting

Slovenia competed in shooting.

Swimming

Slovenia competed in swimming.

Men

Women

Table tennis

Slovenia competed in table tennis.

Taekwondo

Slovenia competed in Taekwondo.

 Legend
 PTG — Won by Points Gap
 SUP — Won by superiority
 OT — Won on over time (Golden Point)
 DQ — Won by disqualification
 PUN — Won by punitive declaration
 WD — Won by withdrawal

Men

Tennis

Slovenia competed in tennis.

Water polo

Summary

Group play

Fifth place game

Weightlifting

Slovenia competed in weightlifting.

Men

Women

Wrestling

Slovenia competed in wrestling.

Men's Greco-Roman

References

Nations at the 2022 Mediterranean Games
2022
Mediterranean Games